Toyama Dam  is a gravity dam located in Hokkaido Prefecture in Japan. The dam is used for power production. The catchment area of the dam is 452.8 km2. The dam impounds about 13  ha of land when full and can store 1370 thousand cubic meters of water. The construction of the dam was started on 1968 and completed in 1972.

References

Dams in Hokkaido